The women's 200 metres event at the 1959 Pan American Games was held at the Soldier Field in Chicago on 31 August and 1 September.

Medalists

Results

Heats
Held on 31 August

Wind:Heat 1: ? m/s, Heat 2: +2.7 m/s

Final
Wind: +0.9 m/s

References

Athletics at the 1959 Pan American Games
1959